Elvira Raimondi (1866–1920) was an Italian woman painter.

Biography

Raimondi was born in Naples in 1866, and she studied in the Academy of Fine Arts in Naples. She  has among her works Mal tempo, Molo di Napoli; Sulla via di Minori; and Olga.

Raimondi died in 1920.

References

1866 births
1920 deaths
19th-century Italian painters
19th-century Italian women artists
19th-century Neapolitan people
Italian women painters
Painters from Naples